Thomas Joseph Coster Jr. (born June 10, 1966) is an American keyboardist and composer.  He played on his first song titled "Zulu" with Santana in 1977 receiving his first gold record the following year in 1978.  In the following years he co-wrote and produced several jazz fusion albums with his father Tom Coster. He has composed music for UMG, Warner Music, Sony BMG, Fox Searchlight, Miramax, The Weinstein Company, Warner Brothers, Sony Pictures, Interscope, Aftermath, Def Jam, AVEX.  He has composed songs with such artists as Dr. Dre, Eminem and 50 Cent.  In 2000 he co-wrote the single "The Real Slim Shady" with Eminem, and Dr. Dre.

Career
In 1999 Tommy worked on various projects, one of which being "The Marshall Mathers LP". From 1999 to 2004, he performed on several records including, "The Marshall Mathers LP", "Get Rich Or Die Tryin", "Devil's Night", "War & Peace Vol. 2 (The Peace Disc)", "The Documentary".

Filmography & Television

2011 to present
In 2011, Coster was involved in the soundtrack for South Africa's first animation movie called "Jock of The Bushveld" which featured the voices of Bryan Adams & Helen Hunt.

References

External links

1966 births
Living people
21st-century American composers
21st-century American keyboardists